Estación Central (Spanish for "Central Station") is a station on the Santiago Metro in Santiago, Chile. It is underground, between the stations Universidad de Santiago and Unión Latinoamericana on the same line. It is located on the Avenida Libertador General Bernardo O'Higgins, in the commune of Estación Central.

The station was opened on 15 September 1975 as part of the inaugural section of the line between San Pablo and La Moneda. It is named for the nearby Santiago Estación Central.

References

Santiago Metro stations
Railway stations opened in 1975
1975 establishments in Chile
Santiago Metro Line 1